Northern Light is the debut album from classical musician and Salford born tenor Jon Christos. The album was released in 2005 by Roots Music Group and produced by Alan Gregson peaked at number 9 in the official UK classical album charts. The album is a collection of new classical crossover songs as composed by Matteo Saggese, James Shearman, Sam Babbenia, Rick Guard and Phil Rice along with well established arias and songs such as; Nessun Dorma, "Caruso", Ch'ella mi creda and Non ti scordar di me.

Track listing 
 Suspiro por ti
 "Caruso"
 Non ti scordar di me
 Immenso Sogno
 Shadow
 Did you ever
 All or Nothing
 Tutto sei per me
 Ch'ella mi creda
 I'll Walk with God
 Forever and ever
 Jubilate Domum
 Nessun Dorma
 O Holy Night

References 

2005 debut albums